Longshaw is a  surname of Old English origin. Variant recorded spellings are Langshaw and Lenshaw.

Notable people with the surname include:

Langshaw
John Langshaw (1725–1798), English organist
Stanley Langshaw (1901–1936), English rugby player

Longshaw
Ted Longshaw (1926–2011), British businessman
William Longshaw Jr. (1839–1865), American naval physician

Further reading
http://www.surnamedb.com/Surname/Longshaw